is a former Japanese football player. He played for Japan national team. His younger brother Kojiro Kaimoto is also a former footballer.

Club career
Kaimoto was born in Suita on November 26, 1972. After graduating from Tokai University, he joined the Japan Football League club Vissel Kobe in 1995. The club won second place in 1996 and was promoted to the J1 League. He played often in 1997. In 2001, he moved to Nagoya Grampus Eight. In 2003, his younger brother Kojiro Kaimoto also joined Grampus. However his playing time gradually decreased. He moved to Albirex Niigata with Kojiro in 2005. Although he played often, Kojiro left the club in May 2006. His did not play as much in 2007 and retired at the end of the 2008 season.

National team career
Kaimoto was selected once to play for the Japan national team.  He played a 2000 Asian Cup match against Qatar at the group stage in Beirut on October 20, 2000. He was relieved in the 39th minute of the match. The team went on to win the tournament.

Club statistics

National team statistics

National team
 2000 Asian Cup (Champions)

Honors and awards

Team honors
 AFC Asian Cup Champions: 2000

References

External links
 
 
 Japan National Football Team Database

1972 births
Living people
Tokai University alumni
Association football people from Osaka Prefecture
People from Suita
Japanese footballers
Japan international footballers
J1 League players
Japan Football League (1992–1998) players
Vissel Kobe players
Nagoya Grampus players
Albirex Niigata players
2000 AFC Asian Cup players
AFC Asian Cup-winning players
Association football defenders